Amygdala is the alias of DC Comics character Aaron Helzinger, who is a sometime opponent of Batman. He has reduced mental capacity, near superhuman strength and endurance, and is prone to outbursts of violence due to medical experimentation on his brain, chiefly the removal of his amygdala.

Aaron Helzinger appeared on the second season of Gotham portrayed by Stink Fisher and the second season of the Arrowverse series Batwoman portrayed by R. J. Fetherstonhaugh.

Publication history
Amygdala first appeared in Batman: Shadow of the Bat #3 and was created by Alan Grant and Norm Breyfogle.

Fictional character biography
Anatomically, the amygdala refers to the bundle of nerve cells in the brain that control emotional associations of many kinds. Aaron Helzinger's amygdala cluster was removed in an attempt to cure him of his homicidal rage. This procedure resulted in Amygdala becoming exceedingly angry and was the opposite of what the surgery was intended to achieve. Easily led due to his childlike nature, Amygdala has been the pawn of a number of Batman villains, but when properly medicated, he can be peaceful.

Amygdala first appeared in Shadow of the Bat #3 in 1992 during the story arc Batman: The Last Arkham. In the issue, Amygdala was forced to attack Batman by the maddened Jeremiah Arkham. Batman subdued Amygdala, but was then forced to face more inmates.

Amygdala later appeared in Part 2 of the year-long story arc Batman: Knightfall, which also saw other characters introduced in Batman: The Last Arkham return to the comic book universe, most notably Zsasz and Jeremiah Arkham. In Knightfall, Amygdala was freed from Arkham Asylum by Bane along with numerous other inmates and was soon under the control of the Ventriloquist. Batman intercepted Ventriloquist, but was promptly attacked by Amygdala. As Ventriloquist escaped, Batman subdued Amygdala once more and the villain did not appear again in Knightfall.

He has been released into the community on numerous occasions, where he has been an ally and friend of Dick Grayson (Nightwing, the former Robin). He lived in the hero's apartment building and worked as a warden in Lockhaven Prison. When Blockbuster was in the process of breaking Nightwing down both physically and emotionally, Blockbuster destroyed Grayson's apartment complex while Amygdala was inside. Amygdala survived, but he was heavily traumatized by the death of his friends.

In the Infinite Crisis storyline, Amygdala was among the villains that joined Alexander Luthor, Jr.'s Secret Society of Super Villains.

He also appeared in the 2008 mini-series Gotham Underground, drinking in the Penguin's Iceberg Lounge.

The New 52
As a part of the New 52 reboot, Aaron first appears in Resurrection Man vol. 2 #6 as a hulking menace when he tries to kill Mitch Shelley in Arkham Asylum, but is knocked hard on the head with Fletcher's nightstick. He later appears during the "Zero Year" storyline. When the power went out in Gotham, Aaron was in surgery at Gotham General Hospital. He woke up in a monstrous rage, smashing through a window. The surgeons had been operating on his amygdala when they were interrupted. After jumping out the window Aaron encountered and attacked a young Dick Grayson, who was out with his friends, away from visiting Haly's Circus. He chases them, while Dick makes a plan to stop him and save his friends. Luring Helzinger onto a rooftop, Dick jumped to the next one over, and unable to make it across the gap, Helzinger fells, unable to get back up. Earning the nickname Amygdala, Aaron spent much of his time incarcerated at Arkham Asylum, and later at Arkham Manor, when the asylum was destroyed.

DC Rebirth
In DC Rebirth, Amygdala appears as one of the many villains attempting to kill Batman to stop Two-Face from leaking secret information. Alongside Killer Croc and King Shark, Amygdala attacks Batman on a train. Later, when Arkham is rebuilt, he becomes partner with Solomon Grundy. Both of them attempted to fight Bane when Psycho Pirate is kept in Arkham after they were all set free by Batman. They are soon beaten by Bane, in turn by Batman. They are later freed once again when Bane takes over Gotham City. Amygdala and Grundy make alliance with Two-Face and kill Doctor Double X, Bane's loyalist. They are then attacked by Gotham Girl (Claire Clover) and the new Batman (Thomas Wayne from the Flashpoint timeline), the former of which uses heat vision to sear off Amygdala's arm.

Powers and abilities
Amygdala is a huge man with the strength and endurance of a championship bodybuilder. His emotional instability and explosive rage enhance this even further, making him prone to bouts of boundless violence unrestrained by the usual barriers and limits set in place by one's self-awareness.

Other versions
In the Elseworlds tale Batman: Crimson Mist—the third part of the trilogy that began with Batman & Dracula: Red Rain, in which Batman becomes a vampire—Amygdala makes a cameo during Batman's assault on Arkham Asylum. Amygdala is killed and then beheaded by the vampire Batman.

In science
Amygdala is briefly referenced in an article by Joseph LeDoux, a neuroscientist and expert in the role of the anatomical amygdala in fear processing, as testament to popular interest in the brain area.

In other media
 Stink Fisher portrayed Amygdala in the second season of Gotham. Appearing in "Rise of the Villains" episodes "Damned If You Do..." and "Knock, Knock", this version of the character is an Arkham Asylum inmate who alongside fellow inmates Barbara Kean, Jerome Valeska, Richard Sionis (who declined Galavan's offer and was killed by Tabitha), Robert Greenwood, and Arnold Dobkins were sprung out by corrupt billionaire Theo Galavan and his sister Tabitha to wreak havoc on Gotham City as part of Galavan's ultimate plan to become mayor and hand over control of the city to the Order of St. Dumas. At some point he was recaptured and put in Arkham. In "Wrath of the Villains: This Ball of Mud and Darkness", when Hugo Strange puts Oswald Cobblepot through the "Ice Cream Therapy" in cafeteria, Aaron attacks Oswald because he is not offered to him an ice cream and Aaron is restrained from guards. Put in the same room with Oswald (albeit chained up), Hugo sees that Oswald doesn't want to kill him, declaring Oswald as sane and letting him go from Arkham. In "Azrael", Aaron attacks Rudy but is restrained by Edward Nygma by telling him that the "Lucy" who talks with Rudy is a ghost. He is later brought to medical chamber when he sees a revived Theo Galavan, now named Azrael, and Hugo Strange manipulates Theo into thinking that Aaron is a demon. Theo knocks him with a chest that contains the recently forged Sword of Sin.
 R. J. Fetherstonhaugh portrayed Amygdala in the Batwoman episode "Do Not Resuscitate". This version is a mentally-unstable patient of Hamilton Dymanics and nicknamed himself Amygdala. He was released by Dr. Ethan Rogers to get to the mystery behind the Desert Rose. Amygdala does that by ramming a truck into the van carrying Jacob Kane and Mary Hamilton where he holds them captive at Mary's clinic. Mary admits some things in front of Jacob like her back-alley work and the Desert Rose coming from Coryana. When Sophie Moore brings Amygdala the map to Coryana which she obtained from Alice and Ocean, he knocks her out as Batwoman arrives. With help from Luke, Batwoman defeats Amygdala.

See also
 List of Batman family enemies

Footnotes

References
 Breyfogle, N. & Grant, A. (1996). Batman: The Last Arkham. DC comics. .

Characters created by Norm Breyfogle
Comics characters introduced in 1992
DC Comics male supervillains
DC Comics characters with superhuman strength
DC Comics television characters
Fictional prisoners and detainees
Fictional henchmen
DC Comics metahumans